Jeff Arons (born April 7, 1960) is a former professional tennis player from the United States.

Biography
Arons, a California native, was an All-American tennis player at Stanford University. He won a gold medal partnering John Sevely in the doubles at the 1983 Summer Universiade in Edmonton, Canada.

From 1985 to 1986, Arons competed on the professional tennis tour. His best performance in a Grand Prix tournament was a quarter-final appearance in the doubles at the 1986 Toronto Indoor.

Arons made two grand slam main draw appearances, in the men's doubles at the 1985 Australian Open and mixed doubles at the 1986 Wimbledon Championships.

In 1988 he co-founded Stanford based non profit summer tennis program East Palo Alto Tennis and Tutoring.

Challenger titles

Doubles: (1)

References

External links
 
 

1960 births
Living people
American male tennis players
Tennis people from California
Stanford Cardinal men's tennis players
Universiade medalists in tennis
Universiade gold medalists for the United States
Medalists at the 1983 Summer Universiade